Soongsil University (Salpijae) Station is a station on Line 7 of the Seoul Subway. As its name indicates, it serves the nearby Soongsil University.

Station layout

Vicinity
Exit 1 : Bonghyeon Elementary School
Exit 2 : Joongang Heights APT
Exit 3 : Soongsil University
Exit 4 : Sanghyeon Middle School

Metro stations in Dongjak District
Seoul Metropolitan Subway stations
Railway stations opened in 2000
Soongsil University